A communist party is a party that advocates the application of the social principles of communism.

Communist Party may also refer to:

Africa

Benin
 Communist Party of Benin
 Marxist–Leninist Communist Party of Benin

Côte d'Ivoire
 Revolutionary Communist Party of Côte d'Ivoire

Madagascar
 Communist Party (French Section of the Communist International) of the Region of Madagascar
 Malagasy Communist Party

Nigeria
 Communist Party of Nigeria
 Nigerian Communist Party

Sudan
 Sudanese Communist Party
 Sudanese Communist Party – Revolutionary Leadership

Tunisia
 Tunisian Communist Party
 Tunisian Workers' Communist Party

Other
 Algerian Communist Party
 Angolan Communist Party
 Communist Party of Kenya
 Communist Party of Namibia (disambiguation)
 Communist Party of Lesotho
 Communist Party of Mozambique
 Communist Party of Réunion
 Communist Party of Togo
 Moroccan Communist Party
 Senegalese Communist Party
 South African Communist Party
 Southern Rhodesia Communist Party
 Swaziland Communist Party
 Voltaic Revolutionary Communist Party, in Burkina Faso

Asia

Azerbaijan
 Azerbaijan Communist Party
 Azerbaijan Communist Party (1993)
 Azerbaijan Communist Party (on Platform of Marxism-Leninism)
 Communist Party of Azerbaijan (1996)
 United Communist Party of Azerbaijan

Burma
 Communist Party of Burma
 Shan States Communist Party

China
 Chinese Communist Party
 Revolutionary Communist Party of China

Georgia
 Communist Party of Abkhazia
 Communist Party of Georgia
 Communist Party of South Ossetia
 Georgian Communist party
 Georgian Workers Communist Party
 New Communist Party of Georgia
 Revived Communist Party of Georgia
 United Communist Party of Georgia

Iran
 Communist Party of Iran
 Communist Party of Iran (1920)
 Communist Party of Iran (Marxist–Leninist–Maoist)

Iraq 
 Iraqi Communist Party
 Kurdistan Communist Party-Iraq
 Leftist Worker-Communist Party of Iraq

Japan
 Amami Communist Party
 Communist Workers Party (Japan)
 Japan Communist Party (Marxist–Leninist)
 Japanese Communist Party
 Japanese Communist Party (Action Faction)

Jordan 
 Jordanian Communist Party
 Jordanian Communist Toilers Party

Kazakhstan 
 Communist Party of Kazakhstan
 People's Communist Party of Kazakhstan

Kyrgyzstan 
 Communist Party of Kyrgyzstan
 Party of Communists of Kyrgyzstan

Malaysia 
 Communist Party of Malaya/Marxist–Leninist
 Communist Party of Malaya/Revolutionary Faction
 Malayan Communist Party, now called Communist Party of Malaya (CPM)
 Malaysian Communist Party
 North Kalimantan Communist Party, in Borneo

Pakistan
 Communist Mazdoor Kissan Party
 Communist Party of Pakistan
 Communist Party of Pakistan (Thaheem)
 East Pakistan Communist Party (Marxist–Leninist)

Sri Lanka
 Ceylon Communist Party (Maoist)
 Communist Party of Sri Lanka

Syria
 Arab Communist Party
 Communist Labour Party (Syria)
 Syrian Communist Party
 Syrian–Lebanese Communist Party

Taiwan 
 Taiwan Communist Party
 Taiwanese Communist Party

Turkey
 Communist Party of Turkey (disambiguation)
 List of illegal political parties in Turkey

Uzbekistan 
 Communist Party of Bukhara
 Communist Party of Khorezm
 Communist Party of Uzbekistan

Vietnam 
 Communist Party of Annam
 Communist Party of Indochina
 Communist Party of Vietnam

Other
(by country)
 Communist (Maoist) Party of Afghanistan
 Communist Party of Armenia (disambiguation)
 Communist Party of Artsakh
 Communist Party of Bangladesh (disambiguation)
 Bhutan Communist Party (Marxist–Leninist–Maoist)
 South Seas Communist Party, with a branch, the South Seas Communist Party in Burma
 List of communist parties in India
 Communist Party of Indonesia
 Communist Party of Kampuchea, in Cambodia
 Communist Party of Korea
 Communist Party of Kurdistan
 Lebanese Communist Party
 List of communist parties in Nepal
 Palestinian Communist Party (disambiguation)
 Communist Party of the Philippines
 Communist Party in Saudi Arabia
 Communist Party of the Soviet Union (disambiguation)
 Communist Party of Tajikistan
 Communist Party of Thailand, initially the Communist Party of Siam
 Communist Party of Turkestan
 Tibetan Communist Party
 Communist Party of Turkmenistan

Australasia/Oceania

Australia
 Communist Party of Australia (Marxist–Leninist)
 Communist Party of Australia
 Communist Party of Australia (current)

New Zealand
 Communist Party of New Zealand

Europe

Austria
 Communist Party of Austria
 Communist Workers Party (Austria)
 Jewish Communist Party of Austria

Belarus
 Communist Party (Bolsheviks) of Lithuania and Belorussia
 Communist Party of Belarus
 Communist Party of Belorussia
 Communist Party of West Belarus
 Party of Belarusian Communists

Belgium
 Communist Party (Flanders)
 Communist Party (Wallonia)
 Communist Party of Belgium
 Communist Party of Belgium – Marxist–Leninist
 Revolutionary Communist Party (Belgium)

Bosnia & Herzegovina
 Communist Party (Bosnia and Herzegovina)
 Workers' Communist Party of Bosnia and Herzegovina

Bulgaria
 Bulgarian Communist Party
 Bulgarian Communist Party – Marxists
 Bulgarian United Communist Party
 Communist Party of Bulgaria
 Communist Workers' Party of Bulgaria

Denmark
 Communist Party (Denmark)
 Communist Party in Denmark
 Communist Party of Denmark
 Communist Workers Party (Denmark)
 Workers' Communist Party (Denmark)

Estonia
 Communist Party of Estonia
 Communist Party of Estonia (1990)

Finland
 Communist Party of Finland
 Communist Party of Finland (1994)
 For Peace and Socialism – Communist Workers' Party

France
 Breton Communist Party
 French Communist Party
 Internationalist Communist Party (France)
 Workers' Communist Party of France

Greece
 Communist Party of Greece
 Communist Party of Greece (Interior)
 Communist Party of Greece (Marxist–Leninist)
 Marxist–Leninist Communist Party of Greece
 Movement for a United Communist Party of Greece

Hungary
 Hungarian Communist Party
 Hungarian Communist Workers' Party

Iceland
 Communist Party of Iceland
 Communist Party of Iceland (Marxist–Leninist)

Ireland
 Communist Party of Ireland
 Communist Party of Ireland (Marxist–Leninist)

Italy
 Communist Alternative Party
 Communist Party (Italy)
 Communist Party of the Free Territory of Trieste
 Communist Party of Italy
 Communist Refoundation Party
 International Communist Party
 Internationalist Communist Party (Italy)
 Italian Communist Party
 Italian Communist Party (2016)
 Marxist–Leninist Italian Communist Party
 Party of Italian Communists

Lithuania
 Communist Party of Lithuania
 Communist Party of the Memel Territory

Moldova
 Communist Party of Moldova
 Party of Communists of the Republic of Moldova

Netherlands
 Communist Party of Holland – Central Committee
 Communist Party of the Netherlands
 Communist Workers' Party of the Netherlands
 New Communist Party of the Netherlands
 United Communist Party (Netherlands)

Norway
 Communist Party of Norway
 Workers' Communist Party (Norway)

Portugal
 Communist Party (Reconstructed)
 Communist Party of Portugal (in Construction)
 Communist Party of Portugal (Marxist–Leninist)
 Communist Party of Portugal (Marxist–Leninist) (1974)
 Communist Party of the Portuguese Workers / Reorganizative Movement of the Party of the Proletariat
 Communist Revolution Committee for the Formation of the Marxist–Leninist Party
 Communist Union for the Reconstruction of the Party (Marxist–Leninist)
 Organization for the Reconstruction of the Communist Party (Marxist–Leninist)
 Portuguese Communist Party

Romania
 Communist Party (Nepeceriști)
 Romanian Communist Party

Russia
 Communist Party of Russia (disambiguation)
 Communist Party of the Republic of Tatarstan

San Marino
 Communist Party (Marxist–Leninist) of San Marino
 Sammarinese Communist Party

Slovakia
 Communist Party of Slovakia
 Communist Party of Slovakia – 91
 Communist Party of Slovakia (1939)

Spain
 Communist Party of Spain (disambiguation)

Autonomous Communities of Spain

Aragon
 Communist Party of Aragon
 Communist Party of Aragon (1980)

Basque Country
 Communist Party of the Basque Homelands
 Communist Party of Euskadi

Canary Islands
 Communist Party of the Canaries
 Party of Communist Unification in the Canaries

Catalonia
 Catalan Communist Party
 Communist Party of Catalonia
 Communist Workers Party of Catalonia
 Party of the Communists of Catalonia

Galicia
 Communist Party of Galicia
 Communist Party of National Liberation

Valencia
 Communist Party of the Menadores
 Communist Party of the Valencian Country
 Communist Party of the Valencians
 Communist Party of the Valencian Country – Revolutionary Marxist

Other
 Communist Party of Andalusia
 Communist Party of Asturias
 Communist Party of the Balearic Islands
 Communist Party of Cantabria
 Communist Party of Castile-La Mancha
 Communist Party of Castile-Leon
 Communist Party of Extremadura
 Communist Party of La Rioja
 Communist Party of the Region of Murcia

Switzerland
 Communist Party (Switzerland)
 Communist Party Opposition (Switzerland)
 Communist Party of Switzerland
 Communist Party of Switzerland/Marxist–Leninists

Ukraine
 Communist Party (Bolsheviks) of Ukraine
 Communist Party of Ukraine
 Communist Party of Ukraine (renewed)
 Communist Party of Western Ukraine
 Communist Party of Workers and Peasants
 Ukrainian Communist Party

United Kingdom
 Communist Party of Great Britain (disambiguation)
 Communist Labour Party (Scotland)
 Communist Party of Northern Ireland
 British and Irish Communist Organisation

Other
(by country)
 Communist Party of Albania (disambiguation)
 Communist Party of Bohemia and Moravia, in the Czech Republic
 Communist Party of Czechoslovakia
 Communist Party (Free City of Danzig)
 Faroese Communist Party, Faroe Islands
 Communist Party of Germany (disambiguation)
 Communist Party of the Karelo-Finnish Soviet Socialist Republic
 Communist Party of Jersey
 Communist Party of Latvia
 Communist Party of Luxembourg
 Communist Party of Malta
 Communist Party of Pridnestrovie, Transnistria
 Polish Communist Party (disambiguation)
 Pridnestrovie Communist Party, Transnistria
 Communist Party of Sweden (disambiguation)
 New Communist Party of Yugoslavia, in Serbia

North America

Canada
 Communist Party of Canada (disambiguation)
 Revolutionary Communist Party of Canada
Revolutionary Communist Party (Organizing Committees)
 Workers' Communist Party of Canada

Dominican Republic
 International Communist Party (Dominican Republic)
 Communist Labour Party (Dominican Republic)
 Communist Party of Labour

Guatemala
 Communist Party of Guatemala (disambiguation)
 Guatemalan Party of Labour – Communist Party

Haiti
 Haitian Communist Party
 Unified Party of Haitian Communists

Mexico
 Bolshevik Communist Party, a Mexican party of the 1960s
 Communist Party of Mexico (Marxist–Leninist)
 Party of Mexican Communists
 Mexican Communist Party

United States
 Communist Party USA (disambiguation)
 Revolutionary Communist Party USA
 Communist Labor Party of America, organized in 1919
 Communist Party (Marxist–Leninist) (United States)
 Communist Workers' Party (United States)
 Provisional Communist Party
 The Communist Party USA and African Americans

Other
(by country)
 Communist Party of Cuba
 Dominican Communist Party
 Communist Party of El Salvador
 Guadeloupe Communist Party
 Communist Party of Honduras
 Martinican Communist Party
 Communist Party of Nicaragua
 Communist Party (Marxist–Leninist) of Panama
 Puerto Rican Communist Party
 Communist Party of Trinidad and Tobago

South America

Argentina
 Communist Party of Argentina
 Communist Party of Argentina (Extraordinary Congress)
 Revolutionary Communist Party of Argentina

Bolivia
 Communist Party of Bolivia
 Communist Party of Bolivia (Marxist–Leninist)
 Communist Party of Bolivia (Marxist–Leninist–Maoist)

Brazil
 Brazilian Communist Party
 Communist Party of Brazil
 Revolutionary Communist Party (Brazil)

Chile
 Chilean Communist Party (Proletarian Action)
 Communist Party of Chile
 Revolutionary Communist Party (Chile)

Colombia
 Clandestine Colombian Communist Party
 Colombian Communist Party
 Colombian Communist Party – Maoist
 Communist Labour Party (Colombia)
 Communist Party of Colombia (Marxist–Leninist)

Ecuador
 Communist Party of Ecuador
 Communist Party of Ecuador – Red Sun
 Marxist–Leninist Communist Party of Ecuador

Paraguay
 Paraguayan Communist Party
 Paraguayan Communist Party (Marxist–Leninist)

Peru
 Communist Party of Peru (Shining Path)
 Communist Party of Peru (Marxist–Leninist)
 Communist Party of Peru – Red Fatherland
 Communist Party – Red Star
 Peruvian Communist Party
 Peruvian Communist Party (Red Flag)
 Revolutionary Communist Party (Peru)
 Revolutionary Communist Party – Red Trench
 Revolutionary Communist Party (Working Class)

Uruguay
 Communist Party of Uruguay
 Revolutionary Communist Party of Uruguay

Venezuela
 Communist Party of Venezuela
 Marxist–Leninist Communist Party of Venezuela

See also
 All-Union Communist Party (disambiguation)
 Communist Labor Party (disambiguation)
 Communist League (disambiguation)
 Jewish Communist Party (disambiguation)
 Libertarian Communist Party (disambiguation)
 List of Labour parties
 Maoist Communist Party (disambiguation)
 Marxist–Leninist Communist Party (disambiguation)
 New Communist Party (disambiguation)
 Revolutionary Communist (disambiguation)
 Worker-Communist Party (disambiguation)
 Workers' Party